The Lake Weir Yacht Club is a historic site in Eastlake Weir, Florida. It is located at New York Avenue. On April 22, 1993, it was added to the U.S. National Register of Historic Places.

References

External links
 Marion County listings at National Register of Historic Places
 Marion County listings at Florida's Office of Cultural and Historical Programs

Gallery

National Register of Historic Places in Marion County, Florida
Yacht clubs in the United States